Geoffrey Martin (9 March 1940 – 6 November 2021) was an English footballer who scored 41 goals from 295 appearances in the Football League playing as a left winger for Chesterfield (in two spells), Darlington, Carlisle United, Workington and Grimsby Town. He was on the books of Leeds United, but his only appearance was in the League Cup. He won the Fourth Division championship with Chesterfield in the 1969–70 season, after which he retired.

According to a profile in the Workington Times & Star, "Martin was not the most skilful of wingers, but ideal in a 4–4–2 format. His work-rate was phenomenal, so strong and persistent."

Martin died on 6 November 2021, at the age of 81.

References

1940 births
2021 deaths
People from Tupton
Footballers from Derbyshire
English footballers
Association football wingers
Chesterfield F.C. players
Leeds United F.C. players
Darlington F.C. players
Carlisle United F.C. players
Workington A.F.C. players
Grimsby Town F.C. players
English Football League players
Parkhouse Colliery F.C. players